The Shaoshan 3 (Chinese: 韶山三) is a type of electric locomotive used on the People's Republic of China's national railway system. This locomotive was the third Chinese electric main line locomotive, built by the Zhuzhou Electric Locomotive Works. The power supply was industrial-frequency single-phase AC, and the axle arrangement Co-Co.

Manufacturers 
SS3s have been manufactured by several companies:
Zhuzhou Electric Locomotive Works (0001～0677;4001～4008;4085～4104;5029～5251)
Datong Electric Locomotive Works (6001～6095;4009～4084;4108～4556)
Ziyang Locomotive Works (8001～8057)
CRRC Taiyuan Co.,Ltd. (4105～4107)

Preservation 
SS3-0001: is preserved at the China Railway Museum
SS3-0023: is preserved at Central South University
SS3-0054: is preserved at the China Railway Museum
SS3-0450: is preserved at Liuzhou Railway Vacational Technical College
SS3-4493: is preserved at Taiyuan Locomotive Depot, Taiyuan Railway Bureau

Gallery

References

External links 
SS3型电力机车_TrainNets.com (Chinese)

Co-Co locomotives
SS3
25 kV AC locomotives
CNR Datong Electric Locomotive Co. locomotives
Zhuzhou locomotives
Railway locomotives introduced in 1978
Standard gauge locomotives of China